Chemmannar is a village in the High ranges of Idukki district, Kerala, India.

Geography

Latitude:9.87858
Longitude:77.193
Pin Code:685554
STD Code:04868
District:Idukki
State:Kerala

References

External links
http://idukki.gov.in/

Villages in Idukki district